In mathematics, Wiman's sextic is a degree 6 plane curve with four nodes studied by .
It is given by the equation (in homogeneous coordinates)

Its normalization is a genus 6 curve with automorphism group isomorphic to the symmetric group S5.

References

Sextic curves